Imelda "Emi" Gallardo Calixto-Rubiano (born August 16, 1960), is a Filipino businesswoman and politician currently serving as mayor of Pasay since 2019. She previously served as a member of the House of Representatives for the lone district of Pasay from 2010 until 2019, and city councilor from 1998 until 2004, and again from 2007 until 2010.

Calixto-Rubiano is the daughter of former OIC-Mayor of Pasay, Eduardo Calixto, sister of former mayor and incumbent congressman Antonino Calixto, and aunt of incumbent councilors Mark Anthony Calixto and Jose "Joey" Calixto Isidro Jr. of the first and second district, respectively.

Early life and education
Imelda Calixto was born on August 16, 1960 in Pasay City as the youngest of the five children of Eduardo Calixto and Leonora Gallardo Calixto. She was educated at the Malate Catholic School at primary and secondary level and obtained her Bachelor of Arts degree in Behavioral Science at the University of Santo Tomas in 1982. She took up Fashion Designing at the International School of Fashion in Greenhills, San Juan and the Office Procedure Course at the Cora Doloroso Career Centre. After graduation, she got involved in her father's business that was involved in marine engineering, pier construction, marine pipe-laying and marine salvaging. She was involved as well as in her own family business which was manufacturing clothes, multi-level marketing and jewelry.

Career
In 1986, Calixto-Rubiano became a private secretary to her father, Eduardo Calixto, during his term as Officer-in-Charge Mayor of Pasay. She became city councilor for second district of Pasay from 1998 until 2004 and again from 2007 until 2010. During her term as councilor, she made various projects, including feeding programs, free medical and dental check-up, and others.

She also ran for representative for the lone district of Pasay in 2004 under Koalisyon ng Nagkakaisang Pilipino but lost to incumbent representative Connie Dy. After the loss, she became the head of the Pasay City Social Welfare Department in 2005.

Congresswoman
Calixto-Rubiano was elected representative for the lone district of Pasay in the House of Representatives, after she defeated incumbent representative Jose Antonio "Lito" Roxas, who sought for his second term, in 2010. She was re-elected in 2013 and in 2016.

Mayor of Pasay
On May 13, 2019, Calixto-Rubiano was elected as mayor in the 2019 Pasay local elections, after she received 125,391 votes. She was sworn in as mayor on June 30, 2019. She is the first female city mayor in the history of Pasay. She led the Pasay City Government especially during the COVID-19 pandemic. She was successfully reelected in 2022 after she received 147,661 votes.

Controversies
In January 2019, Calixto-Rubiano, along with four other officials, including her brother, was charged for being related to alleged fiscal anomalies in 2015, 2016, and 2017.

Personal life
Calixto-Rubiano married Edgardo Rubiano on December 18, 1982. They have four children: Nicole, Lesley Anne, and Luigi.

Calixto-Rubiano announced on February 9, 2021 that she tested positive for COVID-19. On January 2, 2022, it was announced that she tested positive for COVID-19 anew; she was an asymptomatic carrier after having a sore throat.

References

1960 births
Living people
21st-century Filipino politicians
Filipino Roman Catholics
20th-century Filipino businesspeople
Liberal Party (Philippines) politicians
Mayors of Pasay
PDP–Laban politicians
Members of the House of Representatives of the Philippines from Pasay
Tagalog people
University of Santo Tomas alumni
21st-century Filipino businesspeople